Edyta Krzemień (born 24 October 1985 in Bukowno) is a Polish actress and singer. Since 2007, she was associated with the Roma Music Theatre in Warsaw. She also graduated in journalism from the Jagiellonian University in Kraków.

Career 
One of the greatest achievements of Krzemień was the role of Christine in the Broadway musical The Phantom of the Opera. In March 2009, she became the new speaking and singing voice of Disney's Snow White. In 2005–2007, she has performed as Fleur de Lys in the French musical Notre-Dame de Paris. In addition, she also did the role of Bastienne in Bastien und Bastienne. During the Presentation of Mozart's Opera in Kraków, she sang old Polish and Russian songs and presented arias.

Specific roles

Roles in Roma Music Theatre 
Akademia Pana Kleksa – Vocal group
The Phantom of the Opera – Christine (2008–2010 and 2018)
Les Misérables – Fantine (2010–2012)

Discography 
  Opowieści Zimowe - Maury Yeston’s December Songs
 CD with music for the musical Phantom of the Opera – The party band vocal
 Snow White and the Seven Dwarfs – soundtrack
 Les Misérables, 2011 Roma Music Theatre cast – Fantine

Dubbing 
 Snow White and the Seven Dwarfs (2009 Polish version) – Snow White

Other 
 Sweeney Todd: the Demon Barber of Fleet Street, Teatr Rozrywki w Chorzowie, as Johanna Barker
 Tarzan, Gliwicki Teatr Muzyczny, as Kala

External links 
 Edyta Krzemień's page at Roma Musical Theater's original website

1985 births
Living people
People from Olkusz County
Polish actresses
Polish voice actresses
Jagiellonian University alumni
21st-century Polish singers
21st-century Polish women singers